Guertin is a surname. Notable people with the surname include:

Aimé Guertin (1898–1970), Canadian politician and businessman
Carolyn A. Guertin, American member of the Civil Air Patrol
George Albert Guertin (1869–1931), American Roman Catholic bishop
Kenneth Guertin (born 1966), American film director, screenwriter, producer and editor
M. K. Guertin (1891–1970), American hotel chain founder
Philippe Guertin (born 1991), Canadian long-distance swimmer
Robbie Guertin, American indie rock musician